Apuesta (English means Wager) may refer to:
"Apuesta", song and EP by Cirse (band)
"La Apuesta" (The Bet) song by Thalía
La apuesta (film) (The Bet) 1968 Costa Rican film directed by Miguel Salaguero